The Arrondissement of Molsheim  is an arrondissement of France in the Bas-Rhin department in the Grand Est region. It has 77 communes.

Composition

The communes of the arrondissement of Molsheim are:

Altorf
Avolsheim
Balbronn
Barembach
Bellefosse
Belmont
Bergbieten
Bischoffsheim
Blancherupt
Bœrsch
Bourg-Bruche
La Broque
Colroy-la-Roche
Cosswiller
Crastatt
Dachstein
Dahlenheim
Dangolsheim
Dinsheim-sur-Bruche
Dorlisheim
Duppigheim
Duttlenheim
Ergersheim
Ernolsheim-Bruche
Flexbourg
Fouday
Grandfontaine
Grendelbruch
Gresswiller
Griesheim-près-Molsheim
Heiligenberg
Hohengœft
Jetterswiller
Kirchheim
Knœrsheim
Lutzelhouse
Marlenheim
Mollkirch
Molsheim
Muhlbach-sur-Bruche
Mutzig
Natzwiller
Neuviller-la-Roche
Niederhaslach
Nordheim
Oberhaslach
Odratzheim
Ottrott
Plaine
Rangen
Ranrupt
Romanswiller
Rosenwiller
Rosheim
Rothau
Russ
Saales
Saint-Blaise-la-Roche
Saint-Nabor
Saulxures
Scharrachbergheim-Irmstett
Schirmeck
Solbach
Soultz-les-Bains
Still
Traenheim
Urmatt
Waldersbach
Wangen
Wangenbourg-Engenthal
Wasselonne
Westhoffen
Wildersbach
Wisches
Wolxheim
Zehnacker
Zeinheim

History

The arrondissement of Molsheim was created in 1919. In January 2015 it gained seven communes from the arrondissement of Saverne and one commune from the former arrondissement of Strasbourg-Campagne.

As a result of the reorganisation of the cantons of France which came into effect in 2015, the borders of the cantons are no longer related to the borders of the arrondissements. The cantons of the arrondissement of Molsheim were, as of January 2015:
 Molsheim
 Rosheim
 Saales
 Schirmeck
 Wasselonne

References

Molsheim